The following is the list of cities in the Gaza strip, included within five governorates, administered by Hamas Government in Gaza.

History
After the 1995 Interim Agreements, the PNA took control of civil affairs in both designated Areas, A and B where ultimately all Palestinian population centers are located (except those within the municipal borders of East Jerusalem). Israeli Defense Forces became responsible for security in Area B. The Palestinian Central Bureau of Statistics took its first official census in 1997, and has not taken one since, however they have used provisional estimates to determine the current population. The most current estimate was in 2006. Shortly after, the Hamas took power in Gaza Strip, following the Battle of Gaza (2007) and became the de facto administration in the area.

List of cities 
The following is a list of all Hamas administered Palestinian cities, their governorates, their specific jurisdictions and their provisional populations as of 2006 by the PCBS.

See also
List of cities administered by the Palestinian National Authority
Arab localities in Israel
List of cities in Israel
Municipality (Palestinian Authority)
Village Council (Palestinian Authority)

References

 list

List of cities in the Gaza Strip
Cities
Gaza Strip
Gaza Strip
Palestinian politics